I Want to Work for Diddy is a VH1 reality show which features contestants competing for a job working for Sean Combs (a.k.a. Diddy). The first season of the show tied for the Outstanding Reality Program at the 20th GLAAD Media Awards. The first season included Laverne Cox, an African-American transgender woman, that helped launch her television career.

Airing of the show

 There were 11 contestants, but later Kim "Poprah" Kearney from Season One returned and joined the competition.

References

External links 
 

2000s American reality television series
2010s American reality television series
2008 American television series debuts
2010 American television series endings
VH1 original programming
English-language television shows
African-American reality television series